The 1900 College Football All-Southern Team consists of American football players selected to the College Football All-Southern Teams selected by various organizations in 1900. Clemson won the SIAA championship. Most said Virginia ranked best in the south.

Caspar Whitney, the originator of the concept of the All-America team, selected an All-Southern eleven for Outing.

All-Southerns of 1900

Ends
Alexis Hobson, Virginia (O)
Frank M. Osborne, North Carolina (O)
Johnny Finnegan, Georgetown (WH)
Walter Schreiner, Texas (WH-s)
Bledsoe, Washington & Lee (WH-s)

Tackles

Frank Bennett†, North Carolina (O, WH)
John Loyd, Virginia (O)
George Marshall, VMI (Later Secretary of State) (WH)
McCabe, VMI (WH-s)
Wright, VMI (WH-s)

Guards
William Choice, Virginia (O)
Big Sam, Texas (O)
W. F. Cox, VPI (WH)
Branch Johnson, VMI (WH)
L. L. Jewel, Virginia Tech (WH-s)
Joe Lynch, Georgetown (WH-s)

Centers
William Poole, Sewanee (O)
Dan McKay, Georgetown (WH)
Charles C. Haskel, Virginia (WH-s)

Quarterbacks

Charles Roller, VMI (WH)
Warbler Wilson, Sewanee (WH-s)
Brodie Nalle, Virginia (WH-s)

Halfbacks
Virginius Dabney†, Virginia (O, WH)
Henry Seibels, Sewanee (College Football Hall of Fame) (O)
Art Devlin, Georgetown (WH)
Cheevers Barry, Georgetown (WH-s)
Robert M. Coleman, Virginia (WH-s)

Fullbacks
Ormond Simkins†, Sewanee (O, WH [as e])
Bradley Walker, Virginia (WH)
Hunter Carpenter, VPI (College Football Hall of Fame) (WH-s)

Key
† = Unanimous selection

O = selected by Caspar Whitney in Outing. Whitney ruled Walker, Nalle, and Devlin ineligible

WH = selected by W. H. Hoge.  It had substitutes, denoted with a small S. He picked "Walker" of Sewanee as a sub back, but must have meant Wilson.

References

College Football All-Southern Teams
All-Southern team